This is a list of rivers in Aceh, Indonesia.

In alphabetical order

See also 
 List of rivers of Indonesia
 List of rivers of Sumatra

References 

 
Aceh